Piotr Skuratowicz (1 August 1891 – 1940) was a Polish military commander and a General of the Polish Army. A renowned cavalryman, he was arrested by the NKVD and murdered in the Katyn massacre.

Piotr Marian Skuratowicz was born 1891 in Minsk, Russian Empire. He joined the Imperial Russian Army, where he received officer's training. During World War I he was drafted to the army and served with distinction on the Eastern Front. In 1917 he joined the 1st Polish Corps being formed in Russia, he was sent to Murmansk and then to France, where he joined Gen. Józef Haller's Blue Army. In June 1919 he returned with his unit to the re-established Poland.

Fight for independence
During the Polish-Bolshevik War he distinguished himself as a skilled cavalry commander and in 1920 he was made the commanding officer of the 6th Mounted Rifle Regiment. After the war he remained in the army and, following 1932, became the commander of Ostrołęka-based XII Cavalry Brigade. In 1937 came the peak of his career, when he was appointed to the Polish Ministry of Military Affairs as the chief of Cavalry Department. Throughout the entire interbellum period (after 1922) he was also the commander of Grudziądz-based Centre for Cavalry Training. Promoted to the rank of General in the spring of 1939, he became the commanding officer of the Dubno Operational Group, formed of various march battalions of cavalry units. With that unit he was to reinforce the Polish troops fighting with the Germans after the outbreak of the Invasion of Poland. However, after the Soviet invasion of Poland of September 17, his post was taken by Stefan Hanka-Kulesza and the unit was destroyed by the Red Army soon afterwards.

Katyn
Arrested by the NKVD, Skuratowicz was sent to the concentration camp of Starobielsk and was then murdered, aged forty-eight, in the Katyń massacre of 1940, in the NKVD prison in Kharkiv. Among the Katyn victims were 14 Polish generals including Leon Billewicz, Bronisław Bohatyrewicz, Xawery Czernicki (admiral), Stanisław Haller, Aleksander Kowalewski, Henryk Minkiewicz, Kazimierz Orlik-Łukoski, Konstanty Plisowski, Rudolf Prich (murdered in Lwow), Franciszek Sikorski, Leonard Skierski, Alojzy Wir-Konas, and Mieczysław Smorawiński.

Honours and awards
 Silver Cross of the Virtuti Militari
 Officer's Cross of the Order of Polonia Restituta
 Gold Cross of Merit
 Medal of Independence
 Knight's Cross of the Legion of Honour (France)

References

1891 births
1940 deaths
Military personnel from Minsk
People from Minsky Uyezd
Polish generals
Belarusian people of World War I
Russian military personnel of World War I
Military personnel of the Russian Empire
Blue Army (Poland) personnel
Polish people of the Polish–Soviet War
Polish military personnel killed in World War II
Belarusian people of World War II
Belarusian people executed by the Soviet Union
Recipients of the Silver Cross of the Virtuti Militari
Officers of the Order of Polonia Restituta
Recipients of the Gold Cross of Merit (Poland)
Recipients of the Medal of Independence
Chevaliers of the Légion d'honneur
Katyn massacre victims